Okrągłe may refer to the following places:
Okrągłe, Lublin Voivodeship (east Poland)
Okrągłe, Podlaskie Voivodeship (north-east Poland)
Okrągłe, Silesian Voivodeship (south Poland)
Okrągłe, Giżycko County in Warmian-Masurian Voivodeship (north Poland)
Okrągłe, Ostróda County in Warmian-Masurian Voivodeship (north Poland)